Balasaheb Alias Shamrao Pandurang Patil is an Indian politician who belongs to the Nationalist Congress Party. He has held office since 1999 in Karad North. He contested as an independent in 2009 and won. He is currently a cabinet minister.

His father, Pandurang Patil, was also an MLA from Karad North.

Elections
1999: MLA - Karad North (NCP)
2004: MLA - Karad North (NCP)
2009: MLA - Karad North (Independent)
2014: MLA - Karad North (NCP)
2019: MLA - Karad North (NCP)
2019: Cabinet Minister For Co-operation and Marketing in Maharashtra

References

1960 births
Living people
People from Karad
Nationalist Congress Party politicians
Nationalist Congress Party politicians from Maharashtra